Semjon Milošević (born 21 October 1979) is a retired Bosnian-Herzegovinian football player. He last played as defender for FK Leotar in the first half of the 2014–15 season.

Club career

FR Yugoslavia
Born in Čapljina, SR Bosnia and Herzegovina, he started his career in FK Sutjeska Nikšić in season 1995/96. He played over 90 games in First League of FR Yugoslavia.

Bosnia-Herzegovina
In 2002, he moved to FK Modriča for their first Premier League season. In the next season, he moved to defending champion FK Leotar. For Leotar, he played at the 2005–06 UEFA Champions League qualifying. In 2004, he moved to HŠK Zrinjski Mostar and won the league title.

Then arrives move to Azerbaijani football club Olimpik Baku.

In the 2005/06 season he returned to his homeland, Bosnia and Herzegovina, to the NK Posušje club, and stayed in Posušje for another season. Then in January 2007 he moved to FK Sarajevo in the winter transfer window, and he won one more time in the Bosnian Premier League. Milošević played in the UEFA Champions League again, and eventually qualified to the UEFA Cup 2007-08 first round. In June 2009 Milosevic signed a contract with his first club, Leotar.

Poland
Is September 2008 Milošević moved to a Polish Ekstraklasa team Cracovia.

Return to Bosnia
He was back to FK Leotar in 2009 and played 5 games in the Bosnian Premier League before moving to FK Sloboda Tuzla during the winter break. In summer 2010 he moved to NK Čelik Zenica. He played 24 league games and Čelik lost the Bosnian Cup final against Željezničar that season. In summer 2011 he returned to FK Leotar. He played with Leotar in the 2014/15 season in the First League of the Republika Srpska.

International career
Milošević was called-up for the Bosnia and Herzegovina national team in September 2007, but he just appeared as unused substitute against Moldova.

Honours

Club
Zrinjski
Premier League of Bosnia and Herzegovina: 2004–05

Sarajevo
Premier League of Bosnia and Herzegovina: 2006–07

Individual
Ismir Pintol trophy: 2008

References

External links
 

1979 births
Living people
People from Čapljina
Association football central defenders
Bosnia and Herzegovina footballers
FK Leotar players
FK Sutjeska Nikšić players
FK Modriča players
HŠK Zrinjski Mostar players
AZAL PFK players
HŠK Posušje players
FK Sarajevo players
MKS Cracovia (football) players
FK Sloboda Tuzla players
NK Čelik Zenica players
First League of Serbia and Montenegro players
Premier League of Bosnia and Herzegovina players
Azerbaijan Premier League players
Ekstraklasa players
First League of the Republika Srpska players
Bosnia and Herzegovina expatriate footballers
Expatriate footballers in Serbia and Montenegro
Bosnia and Herzegovina expatriate sportspeople in Serbia and Montenegro
Expatriate footballers in Azerbaijan
Bosnia and Herzegovina expatriate sportspeople in Azerbaijan
Expatriate footballers in Poland
Bosnia and Herzegovina expatriate sportspeople in Poland